Samuel Ikechukwu Edozie (born 28 January 2003) is an English professional footballer who plays as a winger for  club Southampton.

Club career

Early career 
Edozie was born in Lewisham, South London. He attended Ashgrove School in Bromley and Beths Grammar School in Bexley. He began his career in the youth system at nearby Millwall before moving away and arriving at the 2018–19 Premier League champions Manchester City in July 2019 for a reported seven-figure fee.

After impressing in 2021–22 pre-season, Edozie made his Manchester City debut on 7 August 2021, being named in the starting lineup for the 2021 FA Community Shield.

Southampton 
On 1 September 2022, Edozie signed a five-year contract with Southampton in a deal which also saw Manchester City full back Juan Larios join the South Coast club. On 3 September 2022, he made his club and Premier League debut in a 1–0 away loss to Wolverhampton Wanderers, coming on after 73 minutes for Romain Perraud.

International career
Edozie was born in England to an Igbo Nigerian father and an English mother. He is a youth international for England.

On 2 September 2021, Edozie made his debut for the England U19s during a 2–0 victory over Italy U19s at St. George's Park. 

On 21 September 2022, Edozie made his England U20 debut and scored during a 3–0 victory over Chile at the Pinatar Arena.

Career statistics

Club

References

2003 births
Living people
Footballers from Greater London
English footballers
England youth international footballers
English people of Nigerian descent
Association football forwards
Manchester City F.C. players
Southampton F.C. players
Premier League players